Restarzew Cmentarny  is a village in the administrative district of Gmina Widawa, within Łask County, Łódź Voivodeship, in central Poland.

The village has a population of 200.

References

Restarzew Cmentarny